Sir Francis Bernard Dicksee  (27 November 1853 – 17 October 1928) was an English Victorian painter and illustrator, best known for his pictures of dramatic literary, historical, and legendary scenes. He also was a noted painter of portraits of fashionable women, which helped to bring him success in his own time.

Life 
Dicksee's father, Thomas Dicksee, was a painter who taught Frank as well as his sister Margaret from a young age. The family lived in Fitzroy Square, Bloomsbury. Dicksee enrolled in the Royal Academy Schools in 1870 and achieved early success. He was elected to the Academy in 1891 and became its president in 1924. 
He was knighted in 1925, and named to the Royal Victorian Order by King George V in 1927. In 1921 Dicksee exhibited at the first exhibition of the Society of Graphic Art in London.

Dicksee painted The Funeral of a Viking (1893; Manchester Art Gallery), which was donated in 1928 by Arthur Burton in memory of his mother to the Corporation of Manchester. Victorian critics gave it both positive and negative reviews, for its perfection as a showpiece and for its dramatic and somewhat staged setting, respectively. The painting was used by Swedish Viking/Black metal band Bathory for the cover of their 1990 album, Hammerheart.

A book on Frank Dicksee's life and work with a full catalogue of his known paintings and drawings by Simon Toll was published by Antique Collector's Club in 2016.

Gallery

See also

 La Belle Dame sans Merci''

References

External links 

 
 
 "Sir Frank Dicksee, British, 1853 – 1928" ArtMagick image gallery
 Phryne's list of pictures in accessible collections in the UK
 "Ophelia" Collections Database, Five Colleges and Historic Deerfield Museum Consortium

1853 births
1928 deaths
19th-century English painters
20th-century English painters
English male painters
Artists' Rifles soldiers
English illustrators
Knights Commander of the Royal Victorian Order
Knights Bachelor
Orientalist painters
Painters from London
Royal Academicians
20th-century English male artists
19th-century English male artists